The 1959–60 season was Fussball Club Basel 1893's 66th season in their existence. It was their 14th consecutive season in the top flight of Swiss football since their promotion from the Nationalliga B the season 1945–46. They played their home games in the Landhof, in the Wettstein Quarter in Kleinbasel. Ernst Weber was the club's new chairman taking over from Jules Düblin after the AGM on 27 May 1959. Düblin presided the club during the period July 1946 until Mai 1959 and in the club's history he is the most permanent president that the club has had to date.

Overview 
Jenő Vincze was hired as new team manager, following René Bader who had been trainer ad-interim. The Hungarian ex-international footballer Vincze had been team manager of Servette the previous two seasons. Defender Ulrich Vetsch joined the club from Young Fellows Zürich, Hungarian striker Ferenc Stockbauer joined from SV Wiesbaden, Paul Speidel from lower tier club FC Olten and Jean-Louis Gygax from lower tier FC Moutier. In the other direction Hans Hügi moved on to Young Fellows Zürich after 11 seasons and 220 league and cup games for Basel. Hermann Suter, who had played 16 seasons for Basel and in 229 league and cup games had scored 104 goals, ended his active football career. Antoine Kohn moved on to play for Fortuna '54. Fredy Kehrli, Charles Turin and Gottlieb Stäuble returned to or moved on to newly promoted Biel-Bienne.

Basel played a total of 44 games this season. Of these 44 matches 26 were in the domestic league, four were in the Swiss Cup and 14 were friendly matches. Only two of these friendly games were played at home, the rest were played away, including two in the Easter tournament in Bruges against Polonia Bytom and Club Brugge KV. The friendly games resulted with six victories, four draws and four defeats. The team scored 33 goals and conceded 18.

Fourteen teams contested the 1959–60 Nationalliga A, these were the top 12 teams from the previous season and the two newly promoted teams FC Winterthur and FC Biel-Bienne. The Championship was played in a double round-robin and the last two teams in the table to be relegated. Basel started badly into the new season, losing five of the first seven games. In fact, the team won only one of their first 16 games and were always in the lower regions of the league table. However, with five victories in their last ten league matches, the team lifted themselves to tenth position in the table, but were still lower positioned than the afore mentioned two newly promoted teams. In fact, Biel-Bienne managed to end the season in second position behind the reigning and new champions Young Boys who won the championship for the fourth successive season. Two of these last five victories were against Lugano and Bellinzona and these two teams then suffered relegation. Basel's top league goal scorers were Roberto Frigerio and Josef Hügi both of whom managed 15 league goals. Frigerio managed a hat-trick in the away game against Zürich on 20 March 1960. 

Basel entered the Swiss Cup in the third principal round. They were drawn away against third tier SC Derendingen and won 1–0 through a goal by their Hungarian striker Ferenc Stockbauer. In the next round Basel were drawn at home at the Landhof against lower tier team FC Porrentruy and this ended with a 5–2 victory. In the round of 16 Basel played a home 1–1 draw with the Young Boys, but then lost the replay 3–5. Luzern won the competition winning the final against Grenchen.

Players 
The following is the list of the Basel first team squad during the season 1959–60. The list includes players that were in the squad on the day that the Nationalliga A season started on 23 August 1959 but subsequently left the club after that date.

 
 

 
 

 
 

Players who left the squad

Results 
Legend

Friendly matches

Pre- and mid-season

Winter break and mid-season

Nationalliga A

League matches

League table

Swiss Cup

See also 
 History of FC Basel
 List of FC Basel players
 List of FC Basel seasons

References

Sources 
 Die ersten 125 Jahre. Publisher: Josef Zindel im Friedrich Reinhardt Verlag, Basel. 
 The FCB team 1959–60 at fcb-archiv.ch
 Switzerland 1959–60 by Erik Garin at Rec.Sport.Soccer Statistics Foundation

External links 
 FC Basel official site

FC Basel seasons
Basel